Sobiemyśl  (formerly ) is a village in the administrative district of Gmina Gryfino, within Gryfino County, West Pomeranian Voivodeship, in north-western Poland, close to the German border.

References

Villages in Gryfino County